Mauno Valkeinen (12 January 1930 – 25 February 2015) was a Finnish freestyle swimmer. He competed in two events at the 1952 Summer Olympics.

References

External links
 

1930 births
2015 deaths
Finnish male freestyle swimmers
Olympic swimmers of Finland
Swimmers at the 1952 Summer Olympics
People from Jämsä
Sportspeople from Central Finland